The Darvaz Range or Darvoz Range is a mountain range in the Western Pamirs, in Gorno-Badakhshan Autonomous Region of Tajikistan. Its name derives from the historical region of Darvaz.

Geography
Starting in the east near the Academy of Sciences Range by Mount Garmo, it stretches from Mount Garmo roughly southwestwards between the Vanj River and Panj River (following the flows of the two), and the Obikhingou, a tributary of the Vakhsh River. The Vanj River separates it from the Vanj Range. Roughly 750 km2 of the mountain chain are glaciated. 

The highest summit of the range is Arnavad Peak (Qullai Arnavad), a 6083 m high ultra-prominent peak.

See also
List of mountains of Tajikistan
List of Ultras of Central Asia

References

Mountain ranges of Tajikistan
China–Tajikistan border
Gorno-Badakhshan Autonomous Region
Pamir Mountains